I. bidentata may refer to:

 Idiocnemis bidentata, a white-legged damselfly
 Isotomiella bidentata, a springtail first described in 1950